Closer to Your Heart was released as the second single from Natalie Grant's eight studio album, Hurricane, on January 29, 2014.

Composition
Closer to Your Heart is originally in the key of B Major, with a tempo of 130 beats per minute.

Charts

Weekly Charts

References 

2014 singles
2014 songs
Natalie Grant songs
Curb Records singles
Songs written by Mozella
Songs written by Rune Westberg
Songs written by Bernie Herms